Merchant Ivory Productions is a film company founded in 1961 by producer Ismail Merchant (1936–2005) and director James Ivory (b. 1928). Merchant and Ivory were life and business partners from 1961 until Merchant's death in 2005. During their time together, they made 44 films. The films were for the most part produced by Merchant and directed by Ivory, and 23 of them were scripted by Ruth Prawer Jhabvala (1927–2013) in some capacity. The films were often based upon novels or short stories, particularly the work of Henry James, E. M. Forster, and Jhabvala herself.

The initial goal of the company was "to make English-language films in India aimed at the international market". The style of Merchant Ivory films set and photographed in India became iconic. The company also went on to make films in the United Kingdom and America.

Some actors and producers associated with Merchant Ivory include Maggie Smith, Leela Naidu, Madhur Jaffrey, Aparna Sen, Shashi Kapoor, Jennifer Kendal, Hugh Grant, James Wilby, Rupert Graves, Simon Callow, Anthony Hopkins, Glenn Close, Uma Thurman, Emma Thompson, Vanessa Redgrave, Natasha Richardson, Ralph Fiennes, Colin Firth, Richard Hawley and Helena Bonham Carter.

Of this collaboration, Merchant once commented: "It is a strange marriage we have at Merchant Ivory... I am an Indian Muslim, Ruth is a German Jew, and Jim is a Protestant American. Someone once described us as a three-headed god. Maybe they should have called us a three-headed monster!"

The expression "Merchant–Ivory film" has made its way into common parlance, to denote a particular genre of film rather than the actual production company. While 1965's Shakespeare Wallah put this genre on the international map, its heyday was the 1980s and 1990s with such films as A Room with a View (1985) and Howards End (1992).  A typical "Merchant–Ivory film" would be a period piece set in the early 20th century, usually in Edwardian England, featuring lavish sets and top British actors portraying genteel characters who suffer from disillusionment and tragic entanglements. The main theme often surrounded a house, which took on a particular importance in many Merchant Ivory films.

History
Merchant Ivory Productions was founded in 1961 by Ismail Merchant and James Ivory in India to produce English language films.

After early, modest successes with films such as The Householder, Shakespeare Wallah, and Bombay Talkie, Merchant and Ivory suffered a lean period during the 1970s. Films such as Jane Austen in Manhattan and The Wild Party failed to find an audience. Their fortunes revived dramatically in 1979 when they made an adaptation of Henry James' novel The Europeans. Their film Heat and Dust (1983) was an art-house hit in Europe, particularly in England. However, it was not until their work together on A Room with a View (1985) that they broke out from the art house into broader success.

In 1985, Merchant Ivory Productions was signed by film distributor Cinecom International Films in order to gave Cinecom access to the 11 Merchant Ivory productions at that time as Cinecom had to increase its distribution schedule. In 1986, Merchant Ivory and Cinecom begin their co-production lineup with the film The Deceivers. In 1987, after 25 years as an independent producer, Merchant Ivory Productions would be courted by Hollywood power brokers and deep-pocket investors mesmerised by the success of the triple-Oscar winning feature film A Room with a View, and decided that they would decline four offers in order that they wanted to make the company to go public.

Around 1990, they moved their productions to England and the United States. Ruth Prawer Jhabvala became their frequent collaborating writer. Major film studios sought them out; Disney signed Merchant Ivory Productions to a three-year distribution deal in 1991.

In October 2015, Cohen Media Group acquired the Merchant Ivory brand and library, 21 films and 9 documentaries including worldwide distribution, for restoration and rerelease as a part of the Cohen Film Collection. Ivory would be creative director on the films' restoration, re-release and promotion.

Members

James Ivory 
Ivory was known for often directing the productions. He received three Academy Award nominations for his work but never won. He received his first Oscar at the age of 89 for his screenplay for Call Me by Your Name, becoming the oldest person to win an Oscar for writing.

Academy Awards

Ismail Merchant 
Merchant was known for producing the films. Despite four nominations, he never won.

Academy Awards

Ruth Prawer Jhabvala 
Jhabvala was known for adapting the screenplays. She received three nominations, with two wins.

Academy Awards

Richard Hawley 
Hawley started in 1987 as Ivory's first assistant director on Slaves of New York. He was involved in every project to some degree thereafter. In 1994, he started co-running the company with Merchant and departed in 2009 after completion of  The City of Your Final Destination.

Filmography
Compiled works from Merchant Ivory Productions.

Academy Award wins and nominations

The Europeans

The Bostonians

A Room with a View

Maurice

Mr. and Mrs. Bridge

Howards End

The Remains of the Day

Call Me by Your Name

Footnotes

External links

Film production companies of the United Kingdom
 
Mass media companies established in 1961
British companies established in 1961
Companies based in London
BAFTA fellows